Dermot O'Cleary, O.F.M. or Dermitius Oclieria (died 1575) was a Roman Catholic prelate who served as Bishop of Mayo (1574–1575).

Biography
Dermot O'Cleary was ordained a priest in the Order of Friars Minor. On 12 February 1574, he was appointed during the papacy of Pope Gregory XIII as Bishop of Mayo. On 12 March 1574, he was consecrated bishop by Giulio Antonio Santorio, Cardinal-Priest of San Bartolomeo all'Isola, with Giovanni Battista Santorio, Bishop of Alife, and Giuseppe Pamphilj, Bishop of Segni, serving as co-consecrators. He served as Bishop of Mayo until his death in 1575.

References 

17th-century Roman Catholic bishops in Ireland
Bishops appointed by Pope Gregory XIII
1575 deaths
Irish Friars Minor
Franciscan bishops
Bishops of Mayo